This is a list of observed supernova remnants (SNRs) in the Milky Way, as well as galaxies nearby enough to resolve individual nebulae, such as the Large and Small Magellanic Clouds and the Andromeda Galaxy.

Supernova remnants typically only survive for a few tens of thousands of years, making all known SNRs fairly young compared to many other astronomical objects.

See also
List of supernovae
Supernova
Lists of astronomical objects

References

External links
List of all known (extra)galactic supernova remnants at The Open Supernova Catalog.
Chandra Galactic SNR gallery
SNRcat, the online high-energy catalogue of supernova remnants

Supernova Remnants

Supernova Remnants, list of
Articles containing video clips